Nektarios Alexandrou (born December 19, 1983 in Nicosia, Cyprus) is a Greek Cypriot former professional footballer. He was a left flank specialist, but he primarily played as the left winger.

Career

APOEL
Alexandrou started his career at APOEL's Academy. He made his debut with APOEL in 2000–01 season. He became a regular member of the team in 2002–03 season and stayed to APOEL until the summer of 2006, playing in total 103 matches and scoring 24 goals. During these years at APOEL, he won 2 championships, 1 Cup and 2 Super cups.

Larissa
On summer of 2006 he moved to Larissa in Greece. Together with Efstathios Aloneftis were part of an important Larissa investment on Cypriot young players. At his first season in Larissa he managed to win the 2006–07 Greek Cup. Alexandrou was considered one of the most important players for Larissa after the team returned to the Super League Greece. He became a starter in Larissa's roster and in the 2007/08 season, scoring important goals in both domestic and European competitions, including a goal against Russian champions FC Zenit Saint Petersburg.

On 13 August 2008, it was announced by Larissa's official website that Alexandrou's contract was terminated. The reason was unknown.

APOEL
Alexandrou re-signed at APOEL on summer of 2008. His return came with the success of winning the 2008–09 Cypriot First Division, with Nektarios being an instrumental part of the team. He also appeared in four official 2009–10 UEFA Champions League group stage matches with APOEL.

The next season, he helped APOEL to win the 2010–11 Cypriot First Division, winning his fourth championship title in his career. He also appeared in six 2011–12 UEFA Champions League matches for APOEL, in the club's surprising run to the quarter-finals of the competition, including the round-of-16 triumph over Olympique Lyonnais where he converted his attempt in the penalty shootout.

The following season he won again the 2012–13 Cypriot First Division, which was his 5th league title in his career with APOEL. During the 2013–14 season, he appeared in five group stage matches of APOEL's UEFA Europa League participation and scored the opening goal in APOEL's 2–1 victory against Bordeaux at GSP Stadium. He also managed to win all the titles in Cyprus that season, the Cypriot League, the Cypriot Cup and the Cypriot Super Cup.

Alexandrou made his only group stage appearance in APOEL's 2014–15 UEFA Champions League campaign on 10 December 2014, playing the full 90 minutes in his team's 4–0 defeat against Ajax at Amsterdam Arena. In the 2014–15 season, he managed to add two more titles to his collection, as APOEL won again both the Cypriot championship and the cup.

After the end of the 2015–16 season, in which he crowned champion for a fourth time in the row, Alexandrou signed a new one-year contract extension with APOEL, becoming also the team's captain.

International career
Alexandrou made his international debut with Cyprus National Team on 1 March 2006, in a friendly match against Armenia at Tsirion Stadium, coming on as a 74th-minute substitute in Cyprus' 2–0 victory.

Personal life
On January 2, 2011, Alexandrou's then girlfriend Marianna Nikolaou, gave birth to their son Ectoras. 

On September 11, 2014, Alexandrou married with Cypriot tv presenter and former model Constantina Evripidou in Mykonos. They have two children: a daughter Ariadne (born December 19, 2015) and a son Nicolas (born May 6, 2020). In July 2021, announced their divorce.

Honours
 APOEL
Cypriot First Division (10) : 2001–02, 2003–04, 2008–09, 2010–11, 2012–13, 2013–14, 2014–15, 2015–16, 2017–18,2016–17
Cypriot Cup (3) : 2005–06, 2013–14, 2014–15
Cypriot Super Cup (6) : 2002, 2004, 2008, 2009, 2011, 2013

 Larissa
Greek Cup (1) : 2006–07

References

External links
 APOEL official profile
 
 

1983 births
Living people
Cypriot footballers
Association football midfielders
Cyprus international footballers
APOEL FC players
Athlitiki Enosi Larissa F.C. players
Cypriot First Division players
Super League Greece players